The 2021 United States Olympic Curling Trials was held from November 12 to 21, 2021 at the Baxter Arena in Omaha, Nebraska. The trials featured six men's teams and six women's teams who played in a double round robin tournament. After the round robin, the top two teams on each side played a best-of-three playoff to determine the winner. The winner of both the men's and women's events will represent the United States at the 2022 Winter Olympics in Beijing, China.

Qualification
As both John Shuster and Tabitha Peterson finished within the top six teams at the 2021 World Men's Curling Championship and the 2021 World Women's Curling Championship respectively, the United States earned an automatic berth into the 2022 Winter Olympics in the men's and women's events.

The following teams qualified to participate in the 2021 Curling Olympic Trials:

Men

Women

Men

Teams
The teams are listed as follows:

Round-robin standings
Final round-robin standings

Round-robin results

All draws are listed in Central Time (UTC−06:00).

Draw 1
Friday, November 12, 7:30 pm

Draw 2
Saturday, November 13, 2:00 pm

Draw 3
Sunday, November 14, 9:00 am

Draw 4
Sunday, November 14, 7:00 pm

Draw 5
Monday, November 15, 12:00 pm

Draw 6
Monday, November 15, 8:00 pm

Draw 7
Tuesday, November 16, 2:00 pm

Draw 8
Wednesday, November 17, 9:00 am

Draw 9
Wednesday, November 17, 7:00 pm

Draw 10
Thursday, November 18, 2:00 pm

Playoff
The final round was between the top two teams at the end of the round robin. The teams played a best-of-three series.

Game 1
Friday, November 19, 5:00 pm

Game 2
Saturday, November 20, 5:00 pm

Game 3
Sunday, November 21, 5:00 pm

Women

Teams
The teams are listed as follows:

Round-robin standings
Final round-robin standings

Round-robin results

All draws are listed in Central Time (UTC−06:00).

Draw 1
Saturday, November 13, 9:00 am

Draw 2
Saturday, November 13, 7:00 pm

Draw 3
Sunday, November 14, 2:00 pm

Draw 4
Monday, November 15, 8:00 am

Draw 5
Monday, November 15, 4:00 pm

Draw 6
Tuesday, November 16, 9:00 am

Draw 7
Tuesday, November 16, 7:00 pm

Draw 8
Wednesday, November 17, 2:00 pm

Draw 9
Thursday, November 18, 9:00 am

Draw 10
Thursday, November 18, 7:00 pm

Playoff
The final round was between the top two teams at the end of the round robin. The teams played a best-of-three series.

Game 1
Friday, November 19, 8:00 pm

Game 2
Saturday, November 20, 8:00 pm

References

United States Olympic Curling Trials
Curling at the 2022 Winter Olympics
Curling in Nebraska
Sports in Omaha, Nebraska
United States Olympic Curling Trials
United States Olympic Curling Trials
United States Olympic Curling Trials
United States Olympic Curling Trials